Eve Gordon (born 16 March 1982) is a New Zealand actress and performer and producer of physical and aerial theatre.

Background 
Gordon graduated with a Bachelor of Performing and Screen Arts from UNITEC in Auckland in 2002.

Career 
Her television appearances include Mercy Peak, Power Rangers and Shortland Street, but she is best known as Stacey, a cycle courier and reincarnated Norse goddess Fulla in the fantasy series The Almighty Johnsons.

During the 2000s, Gordon collaborated with Sam Hamilton in live performances with The Parasitic Fantasy Band in the New Zealand International Film Festival, public galleries, and the New Zealand Film Archive. The work included multi-screen film projectors, lighting effects, gongs, story-telling and occasionally some circus or physical theatre performance.

With Mike Edward, Gordon is a co-founder of circus theatre company The Dust Palace.  They formed the company in 2009 after working with a group of friends on a show at Auckland's first Fringe Festival. The Dust Palace now has an international profile and has toured Canada. In addition to creative direction and aerial performance, Gordon has a wide range of roles in The Dust Palace include seamstress, film editor, and sound and music expert. The Dust Palace has been running circus classes since 2012 and in 2018 gathered funding from investors to move to larger, better equipped space.

Across the last 12 years the Dust Palace have produced 20 full length circus works, all of which Eve has been instrumental in bringing to the stage.

For her performance in Midnight, a collaboration between the Auckland Philharmonia Orchestra and The Dust Palace in 2017, Gordon learned the aerial performance art cloud swing (corde volante). She said about this experience:

Recent stage work includes; HAUS of YOLO, the role of Penelope in Dust Palace's stadium spectacular version of the Odyssey, Ithaca and the role of Persephone / Steph in the Dust Palace performance of Pulp at the 2020 Hamilton Gardens Art Festival.

Filmography

Personal life
She married Mike Edward (who played Dane Romero in the beginning of Power Rangers Ninja Steel) in 2013, and they had known each other for years after meeting in drama school. With him she has two step children Ella and Ali.

References

External links
 Eve Gordon at Arts Front
 
 Eve Gordon at Kathryn Rawlings and Associates

Living people
1982 births
New Zealand film actresses
New Zealand television actresses
Unitec Institute of Technology alumni